Arnulfo Acevedo Espinosa (August 15, 1953 – December 24, 1987) was a Dominican professional baseball pitcher, who played in Major League Baseball (MLB) for the New York Mets, Philadelphia Phillies, and Toronto Blue Jays. He threw and batted right-handed.

Espinosa signed as an amateur free agent with the Mets in September , at the age of 17. He was a September call-up for the  Mets. For his Mets career, Espinosa compiled a 25–33 record. Following the  season, he was traded to the Phillies for Richie Hebner and José Moreno. In , Espinosa had a 14–12 record, with a 3.65 earned run average (ERA), and 212 innings pitched.

Espinosa went 3–5, with a 3.77 ERA, while contributing to the 1980 Phillies World Series championship run, but was not part of the postseason roster. After struggling early in the following year, he was released midway through the  season. The Toronto Blue Jays picked him up, but after only one inning in relief in which he gave up one earned run and four hits, they released him, too. Espinosa retired from baseball after an unsuccessful attempt to make the Pittsburgh Pirates in spring .

Espinosa died of a heart attack, at age 34, on Christmas Eve, 1987.

References

External links
, or Baseball Almanac, or The Ultimate Mets Database
Nino Espinosa at Baseballbiography.com

1953 births
1987 deaths
Águilas Cibaeñas players
Chicago Cubs scouts
Dominican Republic expatriate baseball players in Canada
Dominican Republic expatriate baseball players in the United States

Major League Baseball pitchers
Major League Baseball players from the Dominican Republic
New York Mets players
Philadelphia Phillies players
Pompano Beach Mets players
Toronto Blue Jays players
Key West Sun Caps players
Victoria Toros players
Spartanburg Phillies players
Tidewater Tides players
Visalia Mets players